Gomphaeschna antilope, the taper-tailed darner, is a species of darner in the dragonfly family Aeshnidae. It is found in East America.

The IUCN conservation status of Gomphaeschna antilope is "LC", least concern, with no immediate threat to the species' survival. The population is stable. The IUCN status was reviewed in 2017.

References

Further reading

External links

 

Aeshnidae
Articles created by Qbugbot
Insects described in 1874